The Jagiellonian dynasty, otherwise the Jagiellon dynasty, the House of Jagiellon, or simply the Jagiellons, was the name assumed by a cadet branch of the Lithuanian ducal dynasty of Gediminids upon reception by Jogaila, the Grand Duke of Lithuania, of baptism as Władysław in 1386, which paved the way to his ensuing marriage to the Queen Regnant Jadwiga of Poland, resulting in his ascension to the Crown of the Kingdom of Poland as Władysław II Jagiełło (initially ruling jure uxoris jointly with Hedwig until her death), and the effective promotion of his branch to a royal dynasty. The Jagiellons reigned in several European countries between the 14th and 16th centuries. Members of the dynasty were Kings of Poland (1386–1572), Grand Dukes of Lithuania (1377–1392 and 1440–1572), Kings of Hungary (1440–1444 and 1490–1526), and Kings of Bohemia and imperial electors (1471–1526).

The personal union between the Kingdom of Poland and the Grand Duchy of Lithuania (converted in 1569 with the Treaty of Lublin into the Polish–Lithuanian Commonwealth) is the reason for the common appellation "Poland–Lithuania" in discussions about the area from the Late Middle Ages onward. One Jagiellon, Władysław III of Poland, briefly ruled both Poland and Hungary (1440–1444), and two others ruled both Bohemia and Hungary (1490–1526) and then continued in the distaff line as a branch of the House of Habsburg.

The Polish "Golden Age", the period of the reigns of Sigismund I and Sigismund II, the last two Jagiellonian kings, or more generally the 16th century, is most often identified with the rise of the culture of Polish Renaissance. The cultural flowering had its material base in the prosperity of the elites, both the landed nobility and urban patriciate at such centers as Kraków and Gdańsk.

Name
The name comes from Jogaila, the first Grand Duke of Lithuania to become King of Poland.

Pre-dynasty background
The rule of Piasts, the earlier Polish ruling house (c. 962–1370) had ended with the death of King Casimir III the Great. Gediminids, the immediate predecessors of the first Jagiellonian, were rulers of medieval Lithuania with the title of Grand Duke. Their realm, the Grand Duchy of Lithuania, was chiefly inhabited by Lithuanians and Ruthenians.

Jogaila, the eponymous first ruler of the Jagiellonian dynasty, started as the Grand Duke of Lithuania. As a result of the Union of Krewo he then converted to Christianity and married the 11-year-old Queen Jadwiga of Poland (daughter of King Louis I of Hungary from the Angevins Dynasty). Thereby he became jure uxoris King of Poland as her co-ruler and founded the dynasty. Angevin rulers were the second and Jagiellonian third dynasty of Polish Kings.

Kingdom of Poland

Jogaila and Władysław III

Polish–Lithuanian union 

In 1385 the Union of Krewo was signed between Queen Jadwiga of Poland and Jogaila, the Grand Duke of Lithuania, the last pagan state in Europe. The act arranged for Jogaila's baptism (after which Jogaila was known in Poland by his baptismal name, Władysław, and the Polish version of his Lithuanian name, Jagiełło) (Zamoyski, the Polish Way) and for the couple's marriage and constituted the beginning of the Polish–Lithuanian union. The Union strengthened both nations in their shared opposition to the Teutonic Knights and the growing threat of the Grand Duchy of Moscow. Uniquely in Europe, the union connected two states geographically located on the opposite sides of the great civilizational divide between the Western or Latin, and the Eastern or Byzantine worlds.

The intention of the Union was to create a common state under Władysław II Jagiełło, but the Polish ruling oligarchy's idea of incorporation of Lithuania into Poland turned out to be unrealistic. There would be territorial disputes and warfare between Poland and Lithuania or Lithuanian factions; the Lithuanians at times had even found it expedient to conspire with the Teutonic Knights against the Poles. Geographic consequences of the dynastic union and the preferences of the Jagiellonian kings accelerated the process of reorientation of Polish territorial priorities to the east. The political influence of the Jagiellonian kings was diminishing during this period, which was accompanied by the ever-increasing role in central government and national affairs of landed nobility. The royal dynasty, however, had a stabilizing effect on Poland's politics. The Jagiellonian Era is often regarded as a period of maximum political power, great prosperity, and in its later stage, the Golden Age of Polish culture.

Struggle with the Teutonic Knights 

The Great War of 1409–1411, precipitated by the Lithuanian uprising in the Order controlled Samogitia, included the Battle of Grunwald (Tannenberg), where the Polish and Lithuanian-Rus' armies completely defeated the Teutonic Knights. The offensive that followed lost its impact with the ineffective siege of Malbork (Marienburg). The failure to take the fortress and eliminate the Teutonic (later Prussian) state had for Poland dire historic consequences in the 18th, 19th and 20th centuries. The Peace of Thorn (1411) had given Poland and Lithuania rather modest territorial adjustments, including Samogitia. Afterwards there were negotiations and peace deals that didn't hold, more military campaigns and arbitrations. One attempted, unresolved arbitration took place at the Council of Constance.

Polish–Hungarian union 
During the Hussite Wars (1420–1434), Jagiełło, Vytautas and Sigismund Korybut were involved in political and military maneuvering concerning the Czech crown, offered by the Hussites first to Jagiełło in 1420. Zbigniew Oleśnicki became known as the leading opponent of a union with the Hussite Czech state.

The Jagiellonian dynasty was not entitled to automatic hereditary succession, as each new king had to be approved by nobility consensus. Władysław Jagiełło had two sons late in life from his last wife, Sophia of Halshany. In 1430 the nobility agreed to the succession of the future Władysław III, only after the King gave in and guaranteed the satisfaction of their new demands. In 1434 the old monarch died and his minor son Władysław was crowned; the Royal Council led by Bishop Oleśnicki undertook the regency duties. In 1438 the Czech anti-Habsburg opposition, mainly Hussite factions, offered the Czech crown to Jagiełło's younger son Casimir IV. The idea, accepted in Poland over Oleśnicki's objections, resulted in two unsuccessful Polish military expeditions to Bohemia.

After Vytautas' death in 1430 Lithuania became embroiled in internal wars and conflicts with Poland. Casimir IV, sent as a boy by Władysław III on a mission there in 1440, was surprisingly proclaimed by the Lithuanians as a Grand Duke of Lithuania, and he stayed in Lithuania.

Oleśnicki gained the upper hand again and pursued his long-term objective of Poland's union with Hungary. At that time the Ottoman Empire embarked on a new round of European conquests and threatened Hungary, which needed the powerful Polish–Lithuanian ally. In 1440 Władysław III assumed the Hungarian throne. Influenced by Julian Cesarini, the young king led the Hungarian army against the Ottomans in 1443 and again in 1444. Like Cesarini, Władysław III was killed at the Battle of Varna. Beginning toward the end of Jagiełło's life, Poland was practically governed by a magnate oligarchy led by Oleśnicki. The rule of the dignitaries was actively opposed by various szlachta groups. Their leader Spytek of Melsztyn was killed during an armed confrontation in 1439, which allowed Oleśnicki to purge Poland of the remaining Hussite sympathizers and pursue his other objectives without significant opposition.

Casimir IV Jagiellon 
In 1445 Casimir, the Grand Duke of Lithuania, was asked to assume the Polish throne vacated by the death of his brother Władysław. Casimir was a tough negotiator and did not accept the Polish nobility's conditions for his election. Casimir Jagiellon was the third and youngest son of King Władysław II Jagiełło and his fourth wife, Sophia of Halshany. His father was already 65 at the time of Casimir's birth, and his brother Władysław III, three years his senior, was expected to become king before his majority. Strangely, little was done for his education; he was never taught Latin, nor was he trained for the responsibilities of office, despite the fact he was the only brother of the rightful sovereign. He often relied on his instinct and feelings and had little political knowledge, but shared a great interest in the diplomacy and economic affairs of the country. Throughout Casimir's youth, Bishop Zbigniew Oleśnicki was his mentor and tutor, however, the cleric felt a strong reluctance towards him, believing that he would be an unsuccessful monarch following Władysław's death.

The sudden death of Sigismund Kęstutaitis left the office of the Grand Duchy of Lithuania empty. The Voivode of Trakai, Jonas Goštautas, and other magnates of Lithuania, supported Casimir as a candidate to the throne. However many Polish noblemen hoped that the thirteen-year-old boy would become a Vice-regent for the Polish King in Lithuania. Casimir was invited by the Lithuanian magnates to Lithuania, and when he arrived in Vilnius in 1440, he was proclaimed as the Grand Duke of Lithuania on 29 June 1440 by the Council of Lords. Casimir succeeded his brother Władysław III (killed at the Battle of Varna in 1444) as King of Poland after a three-year interregnum on 25 June 1447. In 1454, he married Elisabeth of Austria, daughter of the late King of the Romans Albert II of Habsburg by his late wife Elisabeth of Bohemia. Her distant relative Frederick of Habsburg became Holy Roman Emperor and reigned as Frederick III until after Casimir's own death. The marriage strengthened the ties between the house of Jagiellon and the sovereigns of Hungary-Bohemia and put Casimir at odds with the Holy Roman Emperor through internal Habsburg rivalry. Becoming a King of Poland Casimir also freed himself from the control the Lithuanian oligarchy had imposed on him; in the Vilnius Privilege of 1447 he declared the Lithuanian nobility having equal rights with Polish szlachta. In time Kazimierz Jagiellończyk was able to remove from power Cardinal Oleśnicki and his group, basing his own power on the younger middle nobility camp instead. A conflict with the pope and the local Church hierarchy over the right to fill vacant bishop positions Casimir also resolved in his favor.

Thirteen Years' War (1454–66) 
That same year, Casimir was approached by the Prussian Confederation for aid against the Teutonic Order, which he promised, by making the separatist Prussian regions a protectorate of the Polish Kingdom. However, when the insurgent cities rebelled against the Order, it resisted and the Thirteen Years' War (1454–1466) ensued. Casimir and the Prussian Confederation defeated the Teutonic Order, taking over its capital at Marienburg (Malbork Castle). In the Second Peace of Thorn (1466), the Order recognized Polish sovereignty over the seceded western Prussian regions, Royal Prussia, and the Polish crown's overlordship over the remaining Teutonic Monastic State, transformed in 1525 into a duchy, Ducal Prussia. Poland regained Pomerelia and with it the all-important access to the Baltic Sea, as well as Warmia. In addition to land warfare, naval battles had taken place, where ships provided by the City of Danzig (Gdańsk) successfully fought Danish and Teutonic fleets.

Other 15th-century Polish territorial gains, or rather revindications, included the Duchy of Oświęcim and Duchy of Zator on Silesia's border with Lesser Poland, and there was notable progress regarding the incorporation of the Piast Masovian duchies into the Crown.

Turkish and Tatar wars 
The influence of the Jagiellonian dynasty in Central Europe had been on the rise. In 1471 Casimir's son Władysław became a king of Bohemia, and in 1490 also of Hungary. The southern and eastern outskirts of Poland and Lithuania became threatened by Turkish invasions beginning in the late 15th century. Moldavia's involvement with Poland goes back to 1387, when Petru I, Hospodar of Moldavia, seeking protection against the Hungarians, paid Jagiełło homage in Lviv, which gave Poland access to the Black Sea ports. In 1485 King Casimir undertook an expedition into Moldavia, after its seaports were overtaken by the Ottoman Turks. The Turkish controlled Crimean Tatars raided the eastern territories in 1482 and 1487, until they were confronted by King Jan Olbracht (John Albert), Casimir's son and successor. Poland was attacked in 1487–1491 by remnants of the Golden Horde. They had invaded into Poland as far as Lublin before being beaten at Zaslavl. King John Albert in 1497 made an attempt to resolve the Turkish problem militarily, but his efforts were unsuccessful as he was unable to secure effective participation in the war by his brothers, King Ladislaus II of Bohemia and Hungary and Alexander, the Grand Duke of Lithuania, and because of the resistance on the part of Stephen the Great, the ruler of Moldavia. More Ottoman Empire-instigated destructive Tatar raids took place in 1498, 1499 and 1500. John Albert's diplomatic peace efforts that followed were finalized after the king's death in 1503, resulting in a territorial compromise and an unstable truce.

Sigismund I the Old and Sigismund II Augustus 

The Grand Duke Alexander was elected King of Poland in 1501, after the death of John Albert. In 1506 he was succeeded by Sigismund I the Old in both Poland and Lithuania, as the political realities were drawing the two states closer together. Prior to that Sigismund I had been a Duke of Silesia by the authority of his brother Ladislaus II of Bohemia, but like other Jagiellon rulers before him, he had not pursued the Polish Crown's claim to Silesia.

After the death of King Alexander I, Sigismund I arrived in Vilnius, where he was elected by the Lithuanian Ducal Council on 13 September 1506 as Grand Duke of Lithuania, contrary to the Union of Mielnik, which involved a joint Polish-Lithuanian election of a monarch. On 8 December 1506 during the session of the Polish Senate in Piotrków, Sigismund I was elected King of Poland. He arrived in Kraków on 20 January 1507 and was crowned four days later in Wawel Cathedral by Primate Andrzej Boryszewski. In 1518 Sigismund I married Bona Sforza d'Aragona, a young, strong-minded Italian princess. Bona's sway over the king and the magnates, her efforts to strengthen the monarch's political position, financial situation, and especially the measures she took to advance her personal and dynastic interests, including the forced royal election of the minor Sigismund Augustus in 1529 and his premature coronation in 1530, increased the discontent among szlachta activists.

Chicken War—the rebellion of Lwów 

 Finally, the protesters criticised the role of Queen Bona, whom they blamed for the "bad education" of young Prince Sigismund Augustus (the future King Sigismund II Augustus), as well as for seeking to increase her power and influence in the state.

Sigismund II Augustus 

Following an agreement between Sigismund I, Bona Sforza and Lithuanian Council of Lords, Sigismund II Augustus was proclaimed as Grand Duke of Lithuania when he was 9 years old in Vilnius in 1529. Initially, Sigismund II opposed the Polish–Lithuanian union as he sought to leave the Lithuanian throne to his heirs as Jagiellonian patrimony. In 1544 Sigismund II began to independently rule the Grand Duchy of Lithuania. In 1547 Sigismund II moved his royal court from Kraków to Vilnius and it had a great influence on the intellectual life of the region. In 1548 Sigismund II finished the Renaissance style reconstruction of the Palace of the Grand Dukes of Lithuania in Vilnius which was started by his father, Sigismund I.

From the outset of his reign, Sigismund II came into collision with the country's nobility, who had already begun curtailing the power of the great families. The ostensible cause of the nobility's animosity to the King was his second marriage, secretly contracted before his accession to the throne, with (said to be beautiful) Lithuanian Calvinist, Barbara Radziwiłł, daughter of Hetman Jerzy Radziwiłł. The secret marriage was strongly opposed by his mother Bona and by the magnates of the Crown. Sigismund II, who took over the reign of the Kingdom of Poland after his father's Sigismund I death in 1548, overcame the resistance and had Barbara crowned in 1550; a few months later the new queen died. Sigismund II accompanied the funeral procession of Barbara from Kraków to Vilnius by personally going on foot through cities. Bona, estranged from her son returned to Italy in 1556, where she died soon afterwards.

Sigismund II possessed to a high degree the tenacity and patience that seem to have characterized all the Jagiellons, and he added to these qualities a dexterity and diplomatic finesse. No other Polish king seems to have so thoroughly understood the nature of the Polish sejm. Both the Austrian ambassadors and the papal legates testify to the care with which he controlled his nation. Everything went as he wished, they said, because he seemed to know everything in advance. He managed to get more money out of the sejm than his father ever could, and at one of his sejms he won the hearts of the assembly by unexpectedly appearing before them in the simple grey coat of a Masovian lord. Like his father, a pro-Austrian by conviction, he contrived even in this respect to carry with him the nation, often distrustful of the Germans. He avoided serious complications with the powerful Turks.

Sigismund II mediated for twenty years between the Catholic Church and the Protestants. Unsuccessful and debilitating beginning of the Livonian War for the Grand Duchy of Lithuania and Lithuanian nobility's desire for equal rights with the Polish nobility resulted in childless Sigismund II's possibly the most striking memorial – the Union of Lublin, which united Poland and Lithuania with equal rights into the Polish-Lithuanian Commonwealth – the "Republic of the Two Nations". Also, German-speaking Royal Prussia and Prussian cities were included. This achievement might well have been impossible without Sigismund II.

Golden Age of Polish culture 

The Polish "Golden Age", the period of the reigns of Sigismund I and Sigismund II, the last two Jagiellonian kings, or more generally the 16th century, is most often identified with the rise of the culture of Polish Renaissance. The cultural flowering had its material base in the prosperity of the elites, both the landed nobility and urban patriciate at such centers as Kraków and Gdańsk. As was the case with other European nations, the Renaissance inspiration came in the first place from Italy, a process accelerated to some degree by the marriage of Sigismund I to Bona Sforza. Many Poles traveled to Italy to study and to learn its culture. As imitating Italian ways became very trendy (the royal courts of the two kings provided the leadership and example for everybody else), many Italian artists and thinkers were coming to Poland, some settling and working there for many years. While the pioneering Polish humanists, greatly influenced by Erasmus of Rotterdam, accomplished the preliminary assimilation of the antiquity culture, the generation that followed was able to put greater emphasis on the development of native elements, and because of its social diversity, advanced the process of national integration. The Academy of Kraków and Sigismund II possessed well-stocked libraries; smaller collections were increasingly common at noble courts, schools and the households of townspeople. Illiteracy levels were falling, as by the end of the 16th century almost every parish ran a school.

The Jagiellons and the Habsburgs 
In 1515, during a congress in Vienna, a dynastic succession arrangement was agreed to between Maximilian I, Holy Roman Emperor and the Jagiellon brothers, Vladislaus II of Bohemia and Hungary and Sigismund I of Poland and Lithuania. It was supposed to end the Emperor's support for Poland's enemies, the Teutonic and Russian states, but after the election of Charles V, Maximilian's successor in 1519, the relations with Sigismund had worsened.

The Jagiellon rivalry with the House of Habsburg in central Europe was ultimately resolved to the Habsburgs' advantage. The decisive factor that damaged or weakened the monarchies of the last Jagiellons was the Ottoman Empire's Turkish expansion. Hungary's vulnerability greatly increased after Suleiman the Magnificent took the Belgrade fortress in 1521. To prevent Poland from extending military aid to Hungary, Suleiman had a Tatar-Turkish force raid southeastern Poland–Lithuania in 1524. The Hungarian army was defeated in 1526 at the Battle of Mohács, where the young Louis II Jagiellon, son of Vladislas II, was killed. Subsequently, after a period of internal strife and external intervention, Hungary was partitioned between the Habsburgs and the Ottomans.

Kingdom of Hungary and Bohemia

Vladislaus II of Hungary

King of Bohemia 

Vladislaus was born on 1 March 1456, the oldest son of King Casimir IV of Poland and Grand Duke of Lithuania, then the head of the ruling Jagiellon dynasty of Poland, and Elizabeth of Austria, daughter of Albert, King of Germany, Hungary and Bohemia. He was christened as the namesake of his grandfather, King Władysław Jagiełło of Poland and Lithuania, his maternal uncle King Ladislaus the Posthumous of Bohemia and his paternal uncle Władysław III of Poland, an earlier king of Hungary.

He was proposed for the Bohemian throne by the widow of the previous king, George of Poděbrady, and was crowned King of Bohemia on 22 August 1471. The period after the death of George of Poděbrady was a time of conflict for the Bohemian throne (see Bohemian War (1468–1478)), and Vladislaus was unable to confront it. At the time of his arrival in Prague, he was only fifteen years old and significantly dominated by his advisers. The succession conflict was settled in 1479 in the Peace of Olomouc, which allowed both Vladislaus and Matthias Corvinus to use the title "King of Bohemia". Vladislaus would reign in Bohemia proper, while Matthias gained Moravia, Silesia, and the two Lusatias. The deal also stipulated that in case of Matthias' death, Vladislaus would pay 400,000 gulden for the entirety of the Bohemian lands. However, this payment was not made once Vladislaus became King of Hungary after the death of Matthias.

King of Hungary 
Great chaos overcame Hungary when the King Matthias Corvinus died without heir in 1490. His illegitimate son John Corvinus was not recognized by the Hungarian nobility, and after being forced to retreat, they called Vladislaus to Hungary, as his mother was the sister of the long ago deceased King Ladislaus and granddaughter of King Sigismund. Vladislaus was then crowned King of Hungary on 18 September 1490.

Vladislaus immediately moved to Hungary, and there he lived the rest of his life, having his court and all his children born in the palace of Buda. The Hungarian nobility reigned and took many important decisions in his name, and his role as monarch soon passed to be in a second plan. Stephen Zápolya, the archbishop Tamás Bakócz and George Szatmári continued with the Turkish war plans and tried then to maintain the Kingdom that fell in a severe economical crisis after Matthias's death. Vladislaus was a cheerful man, but after the death of his third wife, he fell into a severe depression and almost retired from all official issues. Then he gained the nickname of "Vladislaus Bene" (Polish: Władysław Dobrze, Hungarian: Dobzse László, Czech: král Dobře) because to almost any request he answered, "Bene" (Latin for "(It is) well").

Louis II of Hungary 

Louis II was the son of Ladislaus II Jagiellon and his third wife, Anne of Foix-Candale. In 1515 Louis II was married to Mary of Austria, granddaughter of Emperor Maximilian I, as stipulated by the First Congress of Vienna in 1515. His sister Anne was married to Archduke Ferdinand of Austria, then a governor on behalf of his brother Charles V, and later Emperor Ferdinand I.

Following the accession to the throne of Suleiman I, the sultan sent an ambassador to Louis II to collect the annual tribute that Hungary had been subjected to. Louis refused to pay annual tribute and had the Ottoman ambassador executed and sent the head to the Sultan. Louis believed that the Papal States and other Christian States including Charles V, Holy Roman Emperor would help him. This event hastened the fall of Hungary. The Ottoman Empire declared war on the Kingdom of Hungary, Suleiman postponed his plan to besiege Rhodes and made an expedition to Belgrade. Louis failed to coordinate and gather his forces. At the same time, Hungary was unable to get assistance from other European states, which Louis had hoped for. Belgrade and many strategic castles in Serbia were captured by the Ottomans. This was disastrous for Louis' kingdom; without the strategically important cities of Belgrade and Šabac, Hungary, including Buda, was open to further Turkish conquests.

After the siege of Rhodes, in 1526 Suleiman made a second expedition to subdue all of Hungary. Louis made a tactical error when he tried to stop the Ottoman army in an open field battle with a medieval army, insufficient firearms, and obsolete tactics. On 29 August 1526, Louis led his forces against Suleiman the Magnificent of the Ottoman Empire in the disastrous Battle of Mohács. In a pincer movement, the Hungarian army was surrounded by Ottoman cavalry, and in the center, the Hungarian heavy knights and infantry were repulsed and suffered heavy casualties, especially from the well-positioned Ottoman cannons and well-armed and trained Janissary musketeers.

Nearly the entire Hungarian Royal army was destroyed on the battlefield. During the retreat, the twenty-year-old king died in a marsh. As Louis had no legitimate children, Ferdinand was elected as his successor in the Kingdoms of Bohemia and Hungary, but the Hungarian throne was contested by John Zápolya, who ruled the areas of the kingdom conquered by the Turks as an Ottoman client.

Jagiellons in natural line 
Although Louis II's marriage remained childless, he probably had an illegitimate child with his mother's former lady-in-waiting, Angelitha Wass, before his marriage. This son was called John (János in Hungarian). This name appears in sources in Vienna as either János Wass or János Lanthos. The former surname is his mother's maiden name. The latter surname may refer to his occupation. "Lanthos" means "lutenist", or "bard". He received incomes from the Royal Treasury regularly. He had further offspring.

Jagiellonian Grand Dukes of Lithuania

The Jagiellonians were the primary inheritors of the title of the Grand Duke of Lithuania following the deaths of Vytautas the Great, Sigismund Kęstutaitis (children of Grand Duke Kęstutis) as they remained as the most powerful branch of the Lithuanian Gediminids dynasty and were direct ancestors of Grand Duke Gediminas by the man's line.

Jagiellonian Kings of Poland

After Sigismund II Augustus, the dynasty underwent further changes. Sigismund II's heirs were his sisters Anna Jagiellon and Catherine Jagiellon. The latter had married Duke John of Finland, who thereby from 1569 became King John III of Sweden, and they had a son, Sigismund III Vasa; as a result, the Polish branch of the Jagiellonians merged with the House of Vasa, which ruled Poland from 1587 until 1668. During the interval, among others, Stephen Báthory, the husband of the childless Anna, reigned.

Jagiellonian Kings of Bohemia, Hungary and Croatia
At one point, the Jagiellonians established dynastic control also over the kingdoms of Bohemia and Hungary (from 1490 onwards), with Vladislaus Jagiello whom several history books call Vladisla(u)s II. After being elected and crowned King of Hungary, Vladislaus moved his court to Hungary from where he ruled both countries and his children were born and raised. By Louis' sudden death in Battle of Mohács in 1526, that royal line was extinguished in male line.

Other members of the Jagiellonian dynasty

Family tree of the House of Jagiellon

Monarchs of Central Europe

Legacy
 The Jagiellonian University in Kraków
 Jagiellonian Library of the Jagiellonian University in Kraków
 Globus Jagellonicus, is by some considered to be the oldest existing globe to show the Americas
 Jagiellonian tapestries is a collection of tapestries
 Jagiellonia Białystok, a football club, based in Białystok
 Jagiellonia Tuszyn, a former football club based in Tuszyn
 Jagiełło Oak, most noted of the Białowieża Forest oaks
 Jagiellonia, a fraternal society founded in 1910 in Vienna

See also
 History of Poland during the Jagiellon dynasty
 List of Polish rulers
 List of Czech rulers
 List of Hungarian rulers
 List of Lithuanian rulers

Notes

References

Citations

Works cited

Bibliography
 Małgorzata Duczmal, Jagiellonowie: Leksykon biograficzny, Kraków 1996.
 Stanisław Grzybowski, Dzieje Polski i Litwy (1506–1648), Kraków 2000. 
 Paweł Jasienica, Polska Jagiellonów (1963), 
 Wojciech Dominiak, Bożena Czwojdrak, Beata Jankowiak-Konik, Jagiellonowie
 Marek Derwich, Monarchia Jagiellonów (1399–1586)
 Krzysztof Baczkowski, Polska i jej sąsiedzi za Jagiellonów
 Henryk Litwin, "Central European Superpower", BUM Magazine, October 2016.

External links

 Rulers of Poland
 Jagiellonian Dynasty 
 Pages and Forums on Lithuanian history
 Jagiellonian Observatory
 The Jagiellonians: Dynasty, Memory and Identity in Central Europe—a major five-year research project conducted by Oxford University

 
Grand Duchy of Lithuania
History of Lithuania (1219–1569)
History of Poland during the Jagiellonian dynasty
Medieval Kingdom of Hungary
Polish–Lithuanian union